Klaus Maria Brandauer (born Klaus Georg Steng; 22 June 1943) is an Austrian actor and director. He is also a professor at the Max Reinhardt Seminar.

Brandauer is known internationally for his roles in The Russia House (1990), Mephisto (1981), Never Say Never Again (1983), Out of Africa (1985), Hanussen (1988), Burning Secret (1988), and White Fang (1991). For his supporting role as Bror von Blixen-Finecke in the drama film Out of Africa (1985), Brandauer was nominated for an Academy Award and won a Golden Globe Award.

Brandauer has a working knowledge of at least five languages: German, Italian, Hungarian, English and French and has acted in each.

Personal life 
Brandauer was born as Klaus Georg Steng in Bad Aussee, Austria. He is the son of Maria Brandauer and Georg Steng (or Stenj), a civil servant. He subsequently took his mother's first name as part of his professional name, Klaus Maria Brandauer.

His first wife was Karin Katharina Müller (14 October 1945 – 13 November 1992), an Austrian film and television director and screenwriter, from 1963 until her death in 1992, aged 47, from cancer. Both were teenagers when they married, in 1963. They had one son, Christian. Brandauer married Natalie Krenn in 2007.

Career 

Brandauer began acting on stage in 1962. After working in national theatre and television, he made his film debut in English in 1972, in The Salzburg Connection. In 1975 he played in Derrick – in Season 2, Episode 8 called "Pfandhaus". His starring and award-winning role in István Szabó's Mephisto (1981) playing a self-absorbed actor, launched his international career. (He would later act in Szabó's 1985 Oberst Redl.)

Following his role in Mephisto, Brandauer appeared as Maximillian Largo in  Never Say Never Again (1983), a remake of the 1965 James Bond film Thunderball. Roger Ebert said of his performance: "For one thing, there's more of a human element in the movie, and it comes from Klaus Maria Brandauer, as Largo. Brandauer is a wonderful actor, and he chooses not to play the villain as a cliché. Instead, he brings a certain poignancy and charm to Largo, and since Connery always has been a particularly human James Bond, the emotional stakes are more convincing this time." He starred in Out of Africa (1985), opposite Meryl Streep and Robert Redford. Brandauer was nominated for an Oscar and won a Golden Globe for the performance.

In 1987, he was the Head of the Jury at the 37th Berlin International Film Festival. In 1988 he appeared in Hanussen opposite Erland Josephson and Ildikó Bánsági. Brandauer was originally cast as Marko Ramius in The Hunt for Red October. That role eventually went to Sean Connery, who played James Bond to Brandauer's Largo in Never Say Never Again. He co-starred with Connery again in The Russia House (1990). His other film roles have been in The Lightship (1986), Streets of Gold (1986), Burning Secret (1988), White Fang (1991), Becoming Colette (1991), Introducing Dorothy Dandridge (1999, as director Otto Preminger), and Everyman's Feast (2002). In 1989 he participated in the great production film for the bicentennial of the French Revolution by the French television channel TF1, La Révolution française: He played the role of Georges Danton. He has also appeared as King Nebuchadnezzar II in 1998, in Time Life's Jeremiah, from The Bible Collection: The Old Testament.

Brandauer has directed two films:  (1989), in which he starred as attempted Hitler assassin Georg Elser; and Mario and the Magician (1994), based on the 1929 novella by Thomas Mann, in which he starred as Cipolla, a magician with hypnotic powers.

In August 2006, Brandauer's much-awaited production of The Threepenny Opera gained a mixed reception. Brandauer had resisted questions about how his production of Bertolt Brecht and Kurt Weill's classic musical comedy about the criminal MacHeath would differ from earlier versions, and his production featured Mack the Knife in a three-piece suit and white gloves, stuck to Brecht's text, and avoided any references to contemporary politics or issues.

Filmography

Awards 
 1982: BAFTA Award for Most Promising Newcomer to Leading Film Roles – Mephisto (nominated)
 1985: Kansas City Film Critics Circle Award for Best Supporting Actor – Out of Africa (won)
 1985: National Board of Review Award for Best Supporting Actor – Out of Africa (won)
 1985: NYFCC Award for Best Supporting Actor – Out of Africa (won)
 1986: Golden Globe Award for Best Supporting Actor – Motion Picture – Out of Africa (won)
 1986: Academy Award for Best Supporting Actor – Out of Africa (nominated)
 1987: BAFTA Award for Best Actor in a Supporting Role – Out of Africa (nominated)
 1988: European Film Award for Best Actor – Hanussen (nominated)
 1988: Golden Ciak for Best Actor – Hanussen (won)
 1989: Bavarian Film Awards for Best Actor – Burning Secret (won)
 1995: Andrei Tarkovsky Award for Mario and the Magician (won)
 1995: Golden St. George for Mario and the Magician (nominated)
 2000: Golden Globe Award for Best Supporting Actor – Series, Miniseries or Television Film – Introducing Dorothy Dandridge (nominated)
 2000: Primetime Emmy Award for Outstanding Supporting Actor in a Limited Series or Movie – Introducing Dorothy Dandridge (nominated)

See also 
 List of German-speaking Academy Award winners and nominees

References

External links 

 

1943 births
20th-century Austrian male actors
21st-century Austrian male actors
Austrian film directors
Austrian male film actors
Best Supporting Actor Golden Globe (film) winners
David di Donatello winners
German Film Award winners
Living people
People from Bad Aussee